Bradford-Loockerman House, also known as the Loockerman House, is a historic home located at Dover, Kent County, Delaware.  The house is in two sections; one of brick and one frame. The original section dates from 1742 and is a -story, brick, nearly square five bay structure in a First Period English(late-Medieval) / early-Georgian style.  Attached is a substantial later frame addition.  It fronts directly on the sidewalk with no front dooryard, but has a large and very handsome garden behind the main house and on its south side.

It was added to the National Register of Historic Places in 1972.  It is located in the Dover Green Historic District.

References

External links

Historic American Buildings Survey in Delaware
Houses on the National Register of Historic Places in Delaware
Houses completed in 1742
Houses in Dover, Delaware
1742 establishments in Delaware
National Register of Historic Places in Dover, Delaware
Individually listed contributing properties to historic districts on the National Register in Delaware